is an anime television series adapted from the light novels of the same title by Hajime Asano and Seiji Kikuchi. Produced by Feel and directed by Keiichiro Kawaguchi, it was broadcast on the Tokyo Broadcasting System from July 7 to September 29, 2011. The story follows the adventures of Kinjirō Sakamachi, a 17-year-old high school boy who suffers from gynophobia, the abnormal fear of women. While using the men's washroom, he accidentally discovers that the popular and handsome butler Subaru Konoe is in fact a girl. Now that Kinjirō knows about Subaru's secret, he must work together with Subaru and her sadistic mistress, Kanade Suzutsuki, to protect Subaru’s secret from being discovered.

Episode list

References

Mayo Chiki!